Governor Morrison may refer to:

Cameron A. Morrison (1869–1953), 55th Governor of North Carolina
Frank B. Morrison (1905–2004), 31st Governor of Nebraska
John Morrison, 2nd Viscount Dunrossil (1926–2000), 127th Governor of Bermuda from 1983 to 1988
John T. Morrison (1860–1915), 6th Governor of Idaho